Aakash Dabhade (born March 8, 1985 in Nagpur, Maharashtra, India) is an Indian actor working in the Indian film industry. He is known as a versatile actor with great comic timing, expressions and dancing skills. He gained popularity for his portrayal of 'Mohan' in the movie Ferrari Ki Sawaari produced by Vidhu Vinod Chopra and directed by Rajesh Mhapuskar. He came to limelight for his movie Boss with Akshay Kumar. Hindi film Stree gave him the recognition as a very good expressive dancer. Critically acclaimed Film Article 15 (film) starring Ayushmann Khurrana and Directed By Anubhav Sinha gave him recognition as an Intense actor. His TV commercials with actors Imran Khan, Irrfan Khan, Vidya Balan and with brands such as Car Dekho, Nokia, Pidilite LW plus, Bingo wafers became very popular.

Filmography

References

External links
 

1985 births
Indian male film actors
Living people
People from Maharashtra
Indian male actors
21st-century Indian actors